Graeme Fife (born 1946) is a prolific English writer, playwright and broadcaster. His first career was as a schoolmaster and university lecturer.

Early life
Born in 1946 in St Pancras, London, Fife is the son of John Fife and his wife Muriel H. Lickorish. He was educated at schools in Greater London and then at the University of Durham, where he graduated with first class honours in Greek language and literature.

Teaching career
Fife taught Classics for one year at a school in Lancashire, then from 1970 to 1978 was Head of Classics at Gresham's School, Holt, and later a lecturer in Greek and Roman literature at the University of Reading.

Reception
In July 1999, The Independent named Fife's Tour de France: The History, the Legend, the Riders as its book of the week. The Times later ranked it as one of its top five sports books of the year. 

Reviewing Fife's The Terror: the Shadow of the Guillotine (2003) in The Independent, William Doyle called it "The most authoritative treatment we are likely to have for many years."

In 1997, Fife wrote to The Independent to correct it on the origin of the word "clitoris".

Publications
As well as books, Fife has written plays, talks, and stories for BBC Radio. 

His novel Angel of the Assassination (2009) is a fictionalized account of the life of Charlotte Corday.

Books
Polly Polestar (Ginn & Co., 1989)
The Wrong Side of the Bed (Ginn & Co., 1988)  
Story in anthology: The Man in Black (1990)
Arthur the King: a study of mediaeval romance in its social, literary and historical context (BBC Books, 1990, 
 
George Francis: Trainer of Champions (with George Francis, Mainstream, 1998)
Tour de France: the history, the legend, the riders (Mainstream, 1999)
Tour de France: Tour de Souffrance (translated from the French of Albert Londres, Cycle Sport, 1999)
Inside the Peloton: Riding, Winning and Losing the Tour de France (2001) 
The Terror: The Shadow of the Guillotine, France 1792–1794 (2004)
Bob Chicken: A Passion for the Bike (2005) 
Great Road Climbs of the Pyrenees (Rapha, 2006)
The Beautiful Machine (2007)
Massif Guide to the Great Road Climbs of the Pyrenees (2008) 
Angel of the Assassination (novel) (Merit, 2009)
Great Road Climbs of the Southern Alps (Rapha, 2010)
Brian Robinson, Pioneer (Mousehold Press 2010)
Great Road Climbs of the Northern Alps (Rapha 2011)
The Elite Bicycle: a Portrait of the World's Greatest Bicycles (2013)

Plays
Praise Be to God (performed by Edward de Souza Orange Tree, London, 1987)
Reg (performed by Edward de Souza, Orange Tree, 1987) 
The Great French Revolution Show (Deia Majorca, 1984)
Lysistrata by Aristophanes (translated and adapted, Deia Majorca, 1984)
The Silver Nutmeg (musical, with Peter Thorne)
Grimaldi (musical drama, with Peter Thorne)
Once Upon a Time... (dramatic song sequence for narrator and singers, with Peter Thorne)
The Andria (translation from The Andria of Terence, with Sebastian Eden) (Gresham's School)
The Weaker Sex (Southampton)
Gesualdo (Edinburgh, London, Melbourne)
Mr Shakespeare...Mr Liebowitz (Deià, Majorca)
Jam (London, Edinburgh, Swindon)
The Door (opera) France

Screenplays
Chavasse Park (promotional film for architectural development in Liverpool)
Ghosts of Deptford (six short films about celebrated denizens of Deptford)

Radio Scripts
Elias Howe 
Some thirty Stories about composers, Monologues and Duologues 
Snipe 3909 
Earth to Earth 
Vivaldi 
Revolutionary Portraits
The Whisper of the Axe 
Arthur the King 
La Mogador 
The March of the Ten Thousand 
The Misfortune at Seaham 
A Breath of Fresh Air 
Pearls Go with Pearls (script consultant)
Godslots 
Surviving Wagner 
St Cecilia of Sicilia 
Wilf 
Cat's Whiskers, six short playlets
The Figaro Letters 
The Athenian Trireme 
Doggett's Coat and Badge 
The Night Stairs 
Timbuktu: Drowning in Sand 
Vegetarian Cyclists 
Bikesongs 
Bicycle Music 
Saint-Saëns, Samson et Dalila and the Lost Glory 
The Fighting Temeraire, The Battle and the Breeze 
The Sweetness of the Garden
Spem in Alium
Beau Geste (adapted for R4 Classic Serial)
Robert Graves and Myth R3 Essays
many scripts for Pause for Thought

Other
'The View from the Oarbench' in Frank Welsh, Building the Trireme (Constable, 1988)

Notes

External links
Graemefife.co.uk, personal web site

1946 births
English non-fiction writers
English radio writers
English dramatists and playwrights
Alumni of Durham University
People educated at Gresham's School
Year of birth missing (living people)
Living people
Place of birth missing (living people)
English male dramatists and playwrights
Cycling writers
English male non-fiction writers